Harry A. Lawton III (born July 4, 1974) is an American businessman. He is president and chief executive officer at Tractor Supply Company. He is also a member of the retailer’s board of directors. He was the president of Macy's from September 2017 to December 2019.

Early life and education 
Lawton was born in Kingsport, Tennessee, in 1974, where he attended Sullivan South High School. His father worked at Eastman Chemical Company in Kingsport. Lawton grew up playing basketball at the Boys and Girls Club, delivering papers for the Kingsport Times-News and attending St. Paul’s Episcopal Church. 

Lawton holds dual bachelor's degrees in chemical engineering and pulp and paper science technology from North Carolina State University, where he was a Caldwell Fellow. He holds a Master of Business Administration from University of Virginia Darden School of Business, where he was awarded the William Michael Shermet Award.

Career 
Lawton started his career in a paper mill in rural North Carolina. In 2000, he joined McKinsey & Co. and was an associate principal till 2005. From 2005 to 2015, Lawton held different positions at The Home Depot, including President Online and SVP Merchandising. From August 2015 to September 2017, Lawton was the SVP of eBay North America. From September 2017 to December 2019, he served as the president for Macy's. 

In January 2020, at the age of 46, Lawton returned to Tennessee and began serving as the chief executive officer and president of Tractor Supply Company. He is also a member of the Company's board of directors. During Lawton’s first year as CEO, more people began gardening and owning pets and livestock due to the COVD-19 pandemic and Tractor Supply Company saw revenue growth of 27 percent. The company was deemed an essential business. In 2022, Tractor Supply reached #294 on the Fortune 500 list. 

Lawton serves on the board of directors of Sealed Air Corporation located in Charlotte, NC and previously served on the board of Buffalo Wild Wings.

Lawton is a member of the Business Roundtable and National Retail Federation board of directors. He was a member (Agriculture) of the Great American Economic Revival Industry Groups, created by US President Donald Trump. US President Joe Biden highlighted a phone call with Lawton in @POTUS posts on Twitter and Instagram where they discussed the passing of the Ocean Shipping Reform Act and inflation.

Tennessee 
Lawton is a board member on the Nashville Area Chamber of Commerce. He was named by the Nashville Business Journal as Most Admired CEO in 2021 and 2022, and to the POWER 100 IN 2021 and 2022. He was a guest columnist in The Tennessean on April 7, 2021, with "How Tractor Supply Company is helping vaccinate rural American against COVID-19". He wrote an Op-Ed in The Tennessean on October 20, 2021, with "Why businesses should follow Tractor Supply’s push for diversity, inclusion, and climate change prevention".

Personal life 
He lives with his wife, Jodie, in Nashville, TN. They have three children.

References 

Living people
1974 births
People from Kingsport, Tennessee
People from Sullivan County, Tennessee
North Carolina State University alumni
University of Virginia alumni
University of Virginia Darden School of Business alumni
American chief executives
American chief executives of Fortune 500 companies
American retail chief executives
eBay employees